Amart Furniture (previously known as Super Amart) is an Australian founded furniture retailer with 67 stores Australia-wide. Amart was founded by John van Lieshout in 1970 in Brisbane, Queensland. Amart Furniture is currently majority owned by Australian private equity firm Quadrant Private Equity, who gained ownership of the retailer in 2016 in a deal valued at around $400 million. The current CEO of Amart Furniture is Lee Chadwick, who took the position in 2014. Amart Furniture has 67 stores in total, with 21 stores in Queensland, 17 stores in New South Wales, 15 stores in Victoria, 8 stores in Western Australia, 3 stores in South Australia,1 store in Tasmania, 1 store in the ACT and 1 store in Northern Territory. Amart Furniture are currently major sponsors of Essendon Football Club and Ronald McDonald House charity.

History
The companies first retail store was opened in MacGregor, Brisbane in 1970. In 2006, John van Lieshout sold Super Amart to Ironbridge Capital for $500 million AUD. In 2017, Super Amart rebranded to Amart Furniture which changed the companies name, logo and tag-line. Amart Furniture previously had their head office in Springwood, Brisbane before moving to a new facility Head Office in Rochedale Brisbane.

References

External links

Australian companies established in 1970
Retail companies established in 1970
Furniture retailers of Australia
Companies based in Brisbane